Austin Pack (born February 25, 1994) is an American soccer player who currently plays as a goalkeeper for USL League One club Charlotte Independence.

Career

Professional
On 8 April 2015, Pack signed for Puerto Rico FC for the 2016 North American Soccer League season. On 23 January 2017, Pack re-signed for Puerto Rico. Pack spent much of the 2019 USL season with the Pittsburgh Riverhounds. He then signed with Charlotte Independence in early 2020.

On January 10, 2022, Pack signed with USL Championship club Hartford Athletic. Six-months later, Pack re-signed with Charlotte Independence in the USL League One.

Career statistics

Club

References

External links
 Charlotte profile

1994 births
Living people
American soccer players
Association football goalkeepers
Charlotte Independence players
Hartford Athletic players
North American Soccer League players
Pittsburgh Riverhounds SC players
Portland Timbers 2 players
Puerto Rico FC players
Soccer players from Atlanta
USL Championship players